Richairo Juliano Živković (/Rišairo Žulijano Živković; born 5 September 1996) is a Dutch professional footballer who plays as a forward for Emmen.

Club career

FC Groningen
Born in Assen, Živković began playing football at FVV from Foxhol. He was noticed early on due to his agility and speed, and at the age of 11 he left for the youth academy of FC Groningen where he progressed. He brought more attention to himself due to his performance for the reserves team, and by the end of 2012 he signed a three-year contract with the club.

On 2 December 2012, Živković came on as an 84th-minute substitute in the first team's 2–0 win over Heracles Almelo, making him the youngest debutant in the history of the club. On 3 August 2013, the first match day of the 2013–14 Eredivisie season, he scored his first regular season goal for the club, thereby relieving Arjen Robben as the youngest to have ever scored for Groningen. His talent did not go unnoticed, with 11 top football clubs enquiring about him by November 2013, including the likes of Real Madrid and FC Barcelona.

Ajax
On 17 March 2014, Živković agreed to sign for Ajax, taking a three-year contract starting 1 July 2014. FC Groningen also received Ajax forward Danny Hoesen, as well as a percentage of Živković's transfer fee should Ajax sell the player before the expiration of his contract, hereby following in the footsteps of Luis Suárez who had transferred from Groningen to Ajax before him. On 5 June 2014, Živković made his debut for Ajax in a friendly match against Wacker Innsbruck concluding the club's pre-season training camp in Austria. He scored the final goal in the 46th minute of the 5–1 victory. He made his competitive debut for the reserves team Jong Ajax in the Eerste Divisie season opener, a North Holland derby match which resulted in a 3–0 win at home against SC Telstar. He scored his first goal for the reserves in his second appearance from a penalty kick in the 55th minute against Fortuna Sittard, which resulted in a 2–0 win. He made his third appearance for the reserves team in another North Holland derby match against neighbouring FC Volendam. The game ended in a 5–0 loss at home. Živković was sent off receiving a red card in the 59th minute following the ejection of Ajax goalkeeper Peter Leeuwenburgh in the 35th minute of the match.

On 28 October 2014, Živković made his regular season debut in the first team, playing in the third round KNVB Cup away match against SV Urk. Coming on as 46th-minute substitute for Arkadiusz Milik, he scored the final goal in the 89th minute of the 4–0 victory. Scoring on his debut for the first team, Živković became the 50th Ajax player to do so since the introduction of professional football in the Netherlands.

Willem II (loan)
On 22 June 2015, Živković was sent on loan at Willem II, together with Lesly de Sa and Ruben Ligeon. On 1 July 2015, he scored the first four goals in a friendly game against Jong Brabant which ended 0–12. Lesley de Sa also added a goal in that game. However, he already returned to Ajax in February 2016, as his loan at Willem II did not turn out to be a success.

FC Utrecht (loan)
Živković started the 2016–17 season with Jong Ajax for which he scored three times in two matches. Especially after the arrival of Bertrand Traoré at Ajax, his prospects for playing time with the first team of Ajax decreased. On 16 August 2016, he was sent on loan to FC Utrecht until the end of the season.

KV Oostende
On 16 June 2017, Živković signed for Belgian Pro League club KV Oostende on a four-year contract. The transfer fee was not announced, however FC Groningen would receive 10% of the amount received by Ajax in the transfer.

Changchun Yatai
Živković moved to Chinese side Changchun Yatai in February 2019.

Sheffield United (loan)
Živković signed for Premier League club Sheffield United on a six-month loan on 31 January 2020, with the deal including an option to buy.

Emmen
On 25 July 2022, Živković joined Emmen for one year with an option for a second.

International career
Following his first Eredivisie goal earlier in the month, Živković was called up to the Netherlands under-19 team on 22 August 2013. He has also represented the Netherlands at under-20 and under-21 level.

Personal life
Živković carries the last name of his mother Mira, who is originally from Serbia. His father, who left the family when Živković was little, was from Curaçao. In addition to Dutch, he speaks Serbian. As a young child he would visit his relatives in Serbia every summer. Through his parents he is eligible to represent Serbia (and also Montenegro), Curaçao or the Netherlands, as of yet he has not represented either nation at the senior level, but he has appeared in the Dutch youth national team system.

Career statistics

Honours
Red Star Belgrade
 Serbian SuperLiga: 2021–22
 Serbian Cup: 2021–22

References

External links

Voetbal International profile 

1996 births
Living people
People from Assen
Dutch footballers
Netherlands youth international footballers
Netherlands under-21 international footballers
Association football forwards
FC Groningen players
AFC Ajax players
Jong Ajax players
Willem II (football club) players
FC Utrecht players
K.V. Oostende players
Changchun Yatai F.C. players
Sheffield United F.C. players
Guangzhou City F.C. players
Red Star Belgrade footballers
FC Emmen players
Eredivisie players
Eerste Divisie players
Belgian Pro League players
China League One players
Chinese Super League players
Serbian SuperLiga players
Dutch expatriate footballers
Expatriate footballers in Belgium
Expatriate footballers in China
Expatriate footballers in England
Dutch expatriate sportspeople in Belgium
Dutch expatriate sportspeople in China
Dutch expatriate sportspeople in England
Dutch people of Curaçao descent
Dutch people of Serbian descent
Footballers from Drenthe